Logan Township is the name of some places in the U.S. state of Minnesota:
Logan Township, Aitkin County, Minnesota
Logan Township, Grant County, Minnesota

See also
Logan Township (disambiguation)

Minnesota township disambiguation pages